Meara  is a genus of bilaterally symmetric, small aquatic worms in the phylum Acoelomorpha. This genus contains only one species, Meara stichopi, a parasite of the sea cucumber Parastichopus tremulus. It occurs in Norway and Sweden.

References

Acoelomorphs
Fauna of Norway
Fauna of Sweden
Animals described in 1949